The 1995 winners of the Torneo di Viareggio (in English, the Viareggio Tournament, officially the Viareggio Cup World Football Tournament Coppa Carnevale), the annual youth football tournament held in Viareggio, Tuscany, are listed below.

Format
The 24 teams are seeded in 6 groups. Each team from a group meets the others in a single tie. The winning club and runners-up from each group progress to the second round. In the second round teams are split up in two groups and meet in a single tie (with penalties after regular time). Winners progress to the final knockout stage, along with the best losing club. The final round matches include 30 minutes extra time and penalties to be played if the draw between teams still holds. The semifinals winning teams play the final with extra time and repeat the match if the draw holds.

Participating teams
Italian teams

  Bari
  Brescia
  Fiorentina
  Inter Milan
  Italy U-20
  Juventus
  Lazio
  Lucchese
  Milan
  Napoli
  Noia
  Padova
  Palermo
  Parma
  Perugia
  Reggina
  Roma
  Torino

European teams

  Bayer 04 Leverkusen
  Southampton
  Espanyol

American teams
  Pumas
Asian teams
  Yomiuri
Oceanian teams
  Marconi Stallions

Group stage

Group 1

Group 2

Group 3

Group 4

Group 5

Group 6

Second round

Knockout stage

Champions

Footnotes

External links
 Official Site (Italian)
 Results on RSSSF.com

1995
1994–95 in Italian football
1994–95 in German football
1994–95 in Mexican football
1994–95 in English football
1994–95 in Spanish football
1995 in Japanese football
1995 in Australian soccer